Cardinal Richelieu is a 1935 American historical film directed by Rowland V. Lee and starring George Arliss, Maureen O'Sullivan, Edward Arnold and Cesar Romero. It was based on the 1839 play Richelieu by Edward Bulwer-Lytton depicting the life of the great seventeenth century French statesman Cardinal Richelieu and his dealings with Louis XIII.

Cast
 George Arliss as Cardinal Richelieu
 Maureen O'Sullivan as Lenore
 Edward Arnold as Louis XIII
 Cesar Romero as Andre de Pons
 Douglass Dumbrille as Baradas
 Francis Lister as Gaston
 Halliwell Hobbes as Father Joseph
 Violet Kemble Cooper as Queen Marie
 Katharine Alexander as Anne of Austria
 Lumsden Hare as Gustavus Adolphus of Sweden
 Russell Hicks as Le Moyne
 Murray Kinnell as Duke of Lorraine
 Herbert Bunston as Duke of Normandy
 Guy Bellis as Duke of Buckingham
 Boyd Irwin as Austrian Prime Minister
 Leonard Mudie as Olivares
 Reginald Sheffield as Richelieu's Outrider
 William Worthington as King's Chamberlain
 Gilbert Emery as Noble
 John Carradine as Agitator

References

External links

1935 films
1930s historical drama films
American historical drama films
Films based on works by Edward Bulwer-Lytton
Films set in the 1620s
Films set in the 1630s
Films set in France
Films set in Paris
Biographical films about politicians
Films directed by Rowland V. Lee
Films produced by Darryl F. Zanuck
Films scored by Alfred Newman
Twentieth Century Pictures films
American black-and-white films
United Artists films
Cultural depictions of Cardinal Richelieu
Cultural depictions of Louis XIII
Cultural depictions of Marie de' Medici
Cultural depictions of Gustavus Adolphus of Sweden
1935 drama films
1930s English-language films
1930s American films